Ludovic Walter (born 4 January 1983) is a French former professional tennis player.

Walter, who comes from the town of Vannes in Brittany, spent his early career in the United States playing varsity tennis for Duke University, where he was a three-time All-American (2004, 2005 and 2006).

From 2006 to 2012 he competed on the professional tour and reached his career high singles ranking of 279 on his final month on tour. He featured in one ATP Tour main draw, as the qualifier at the 2011 UNICEF Open in Rosmalen.

Walter now works in finance and is based in London.

ATP Challenger and ITF Futures finals

Singles: 10 (3–7)

Doubles: 18 (7–11)

References

External links
 
 

1983 births
Living people
French male tennis players
Duke Blue Devils men's tennis players
Sportspeople from Vannes
21st-century French people